On the Double is a 1961 comedy film, directed by Melville Shavelson, who also wrote the screenplay with Jack Rose. It stars Danny Kaye who plays, as in many of his films, two roles — in this case, an American soldier and a British General.

Plot
England, 1944. After an attempt on the life of British high commander General Sir Lawrence MacKenzie-Smith (Danny Kaye) by German intelligence, all military camps in England are sealed off, resulting in leaves of absence being revoked. Ernie Williams (Kaye), a most reluctant American soldier, hypochondriac and talented mimic, and his fellow conscript Joseph Praeger (Jesse White) are thus left trapped in an Allied army camp in southeast England just before they can return to the States. In order to relieve his frustration, Ernie impersonates MacKenzie during dinner in the mess hall; a British officer entering the building falls for his disguise, sparking the idea in Praeger to use Ernie as a double to get them out of the camp. However, Praeger's unfamiliarity with cars causes them to be caught before they even get out of sight of the gate guards.

The incident and Ernie's remarkable resemblance to MacKenzie cause Allied military intelligence leaders Colonel Somerset (Wilfrid Hyde-White) and Colonel Houston (Gregory Walcott) to consider recruiting Ernie (under threat of court-martial) as the General's political decoy, in order to thwart the assassination plot. After Ernie is presented to MacKenzie in person, the General, after some initial reservations, agrees to the plan. MacKenzie's life is at stake because he is the leading strategist in the upcoming invasion of the European mainland; he is set to travel to Invasion Headquarters, adopting Ernie's identity as his disguise and vice versa in order to deceive German High Command. Only Sergeant Twickenham (Terence De Marney), MacKenzie's batman, is made privy to the situation, as he is to help Ernie maintain the deceit. However, the most vital detail – that Ernie will serve as a decoy target for German intelligence – is conveniently withheld from him.

The situation gradually begins to unravel when Lady Margaret (Dana Wynter), MacKenzie's wife, returns prematurely from a war bond tour in Canada to inform MacKenzie of her intention to divorce him, having tired of his neglect of her and his womanizing. As the result of Ernie's attempts to greet her with innocent marital affection, Lady Margaret quickly recognizes him as an impostor and is out of necessity made familiar with the situation. Taking pity on Ernie, she tells him more private details about MacKenzie which help complement his disguise. However, German intelligence continues its liquidation attempts, which result in Twickenham getting poisoned and a sniping attempt during a rallying speech to the troops, prompting Margaret to tell Ernie the entire truth. However, while trying to hand in his resignation from the project, Ernie and Margaret learn that the plane MacKenzie was travelling on was shot down by the Germans, with all hands lost, forcing Ernie to carry on the charade.

At a regimental party where Ernie is supposed to participate, the Secret Service intends to expose and apprehend a traitor who has been feeding information about MacKenzie to the Germans; one of his agents is revealed to be Captain Patterson (Allan Cuthbertson). During the party, Ernie is very nearly exposed as an impostor by his usual blunders and MacKenzie's aggressively domineering aunt, Lady Vivian (Margaret Rutherford). Acting upon Lady Margaret's advice, he pretends to be drunk and have a fight with his wife in order to have an excuse for leaving the party early. Afterwards, in private, Ernie and Margaret confess that they have developed feelings for each other, but then Ernie receives a message that the traitor was apparently caught and that he is ordered back to Headquarters. On his way there, he is kidnapped by Captain Patterson and Sergeant Bridget Stanhope (Diana Dors), MacKenzie's driver and mistress as well as Patterson's accomplice.

Ernie is flown to Berlin and interrogated about the Allied invasion plans, and his German captors refuse to believe his desperate attempts to explain that he is a mere decoy. Forced to go along with the game, he begins to blab about non-existent invasion plots, which the Germans readily take for the truth. Once left alone, Ernie acquires a list of German agents in Britain and facilitates his escape from German Headquarters. Chased through the streets of Berlin in the midst of a nocturnal bombing raid, he keeps changing disguises on the proverbial run, including a brief stint as Adolf Hitler and a subsequent cabaret act in a Berlin nightclub as "Fräulein Lilli" (in the style of Marlene Dietrich as Lola-Lola in The Blue Angel, singing a mash-up of the various running gag catchphrases that have been in use throughout the film in a Germanicized English word salad, all to the tune of the 1934 song Cocktails for Two.)

Finally, disguised as a pilot, Ernie boards a German bomber bound for England and manages to parachute out. Captured, he is brought to General Wiffingham (Rex Evans), a friend of MacKenzie's, but as he reads him the names on his list, Ernie discovers to his dismay that Wiffingham is the chief Nazi infiltrator within the British Secret Service. Somerset has in the meantime figured out Wiffingham's true allegiance on his own, and rescues Ernie before Wiffingham can have him silenced via summary execution by firing squad for espionage. The invasion proceeds smoothly, and what appears to be MacKenzie surprisingly returns from the dead, only to reveal himself to Margaret as Ernie, and the two end the film confessing their love for each other.

Cast
Danny Kaye as Private First Class Ernie Williams / General Sir Lawrence MacKenzie-Smith
Dana Wynter as Lady Margaret MacKenzie-Smith
Wilfrid Hyde-White as Colonel Somerset
Margaret Rutherford as Lady Vivian
Diana Dors as Sergeant Bridget Stanhope
Allan Cuthbertson as Captain Patterson
Jesse White as Corporal Joseph Praeger
Gregory Walcott as Colonel Rock Houston
Terence De Marney as Sergeant Colin Twickenham
Rex Evans as General Carleton Brown Wiffingham
Rudolph Anders as Oberkommandant
Edgar Barrier as Blankmeister
Ben Astar as General Zlinkov
Bobby Watson as Adolf Hitler

Production
After making The Five Pennies Danny Kaye, Mel Shalvelson and Jack Rose decided they wanted to make a straight comedy, "a picture that had no message at all."

Background filming  took place in London in August 1960. Dana Wynter was borrowed from 20th Century Fox. The movie started shooting in Los Angeles in November. Diana Dors had recently relocated to Hollywood.

Critical reception
Despite finding script and direction  "below par," the Radio Times opined "Most Kaye movies have their moments, and there are a few good laughs" ; 
whereas DVD Talk thought it "acceptable fun for fans of Danny Kaye, yet it plays like something made ten years earlier." Allmovie however, noted a "lively WW II-era comedy."

References

External links
 
 
 

1961 films
1961 comedy films
American comedy films
Films directed by Melville Shavelson
Films set in Berlin
Military humor in film
Paramount Pictures films
American World War II films
Films adapted into comics
1960s English-language films
1960s American films